Grand Army of the Republic Hall, GAR Building, or variants thereof, may refer to:

Florida
Grand Army of the Republic Memorial Hall (St. Cloud, Florida)

Idaho
 Grand Army of the Republic Hall (Boise, Idaho)

Illinois
Grand Army of the Republic Hall (Aurora, Illinois)
Grand Army of the Republic Memorial Hall (Peoria. Illinois)

Iowa
G.A.R. Memorial Hall (Algona, Iowa)
Franklin County G. A. R. Soldiers' Memorial Hall (Iowa)

Massachusetts
 Grand Army of the Republic Hall (Lynn, Massachusetts), listed on the National Register of Historic Places
 Grand Army of the Republic Hall (Orange, Massachusetts)
 Grand Army of the Republic Hall (Rockland, Massachusetts)
 Grand Army of the Republic Hall (Worcester, Massachusetts)
 Lothrop Memorial Building-G.A.R. Hall, Taunton, Massachusetts

Michigan
 Grand Army of the Republic Building, Detroit, Michigan, listed on the NRHP in Wayne County, Michigan
 Grand Army of the Republic Hall (Marshall, Michigan), a state historic site in Calhoun County
 Sunfield G. A. R. Hall, listed on the National Register of Historic Places

Minnesota
 Clearwater Masonic and Grand Army of the Republic Hall, also known as Clearwater Masonic Lodge
 Grand Army of the Republic Hall (Grand Meadow, Minnesota)
 Grand Army of the Republic Hall (Litchfield, Minnesota)

Nebraska
 Grand Army of the Republic Memorial Hall (Nebraska City, Nebraska)

New Hampshire
 Grand Army of the Republic Hall (Peterborough), see

New York
 Grand Army of the Republic Hall (Halsey Valley, New York)

Ohio
 Grand Army of the Republic Memorial Hall (Ironton, Ohio), on the National Register of Historic Places listings in Lawrence County, Ohio

Pennsylvania
Grand Army of the Republic Hall (Johnstown, Pennsylvania)
GAR Building (Lykens, Pennsylvania), listed on the National Register of Historic Places in Dauphin County, Pennsylvania

South Dakota

 Grand Army of the Republic Hall (Yankton, South Dakota), G.A.R. Hall Art Gallery (Home of Yankton Area Arts Association)

Wisconsin
Boscobel Grand Army of the Republic Hall, Boscobel, Wisconsin
Grand Army of the Republic Memorial Hall, now the Wisconsin Veterans Museum, Madison

See also
Grand Army of the Republic
Grand Army of the Republic Memorial (disambiguation)
Franklin County G. A. R. Soldiers' Memorial Hall (Iowa)
Grand Army Plaza, Manhattan, New York
G. A. R. Memorial Junior Senior High School
Memorial Hall (Rockford, Illinois)
National Civil War Museum, Harrisburg, Pennsylvania
New England Civil War Museum, Rockville, Connecticut
Porter County Memorial Opera Hall